"Too Cold at Home" is a song written by Bobby Harden, and recorded by American country music singer Mark Chesnutt. It was released on July 16, 1990, as the lead single from his album of the same name. It peaked at number 3 in the United States, while it was a number-one hit in Canada in their respective country music charts.

Music video
The music video was directed by Bill Young. It begins with Chesnutt driving up to a bar and going in, with the radio blasting how hot it is outside. Inside the dead establishment, he reflects on some posters and trophies of the Dodgers (as mentioned in the lyrics) on the wall. It then cuts to him and a full band performing the song to a much livelier and more crowded bar at night. The acting Chesnutt then leaves and passes by his trailer home (which is locked) before driving down the road with the radio blasting the weather again after the song is finished. It was filmed at the Pine Tree Lodge in LaBelle, Texas, and at Cutter's in Beaumont, Texas.

Chart performance

Year-end charts

References

External links
[  Allmusic]

1990 songs
1990 debut singles
Mark Chesnutt songs
Song recordings produced by Mark Wright (record producer)
Songs written by Bobby Harden
MCA Records singles